Lazarevka is a rural locality (a selo) in Lazarevsky Selsoviet of Tambovsky District, Amur Oblast, Russia. The population was 314 as of 2018. There are 5 streets.

Geography 
Lazarevka is located 29 km northeast of Tambovka (the district's administrative centre) by road. Kozmodemyanovka is the nearest rural locality.

References 

Rural localities in Tambovsky District, Amur Oblast